Upamaka is a village in Nakkapalle mandal of Anakapalli district of Andhra Pradesh in India, where an ancient temple of Lord Venkateswara Swamy is present. Upamaka, is a small village very much like a Minnow.

Villages in Anakapalli  district